The 1927 George Washington Hatchetites football team was an American football team that represented George Washington University as an independent during the 1927 college football season. In their fourth season under head coach Harry W. Crum, the team compiled a 7–2 record.

Schedule

References

George Washington
George Washington Colonials football seasons
George Washington Hatchetites football